Prunus glabrifolia is a species of Prunus native to Malaya, Sumatra and Sarawak. It is a shrub or small tree reaching 15m. It is morphologically somewhat similar to Prunus grisea var. tomentosa, but can be easily distinguished by its much stiffer leaves.

References

glabrifolia
Flora of Peninsular Malaysia
Trees of Peninsular Malaysia
Flora of Sumatra
Flora of Sarawak
Plants described in 1965